Kal-e Abdol Ghani (also Romanized as Kāl-e ‘Abdol Ghanī) is a village in Kuh Yakhab Rural District, Dastgerdan District, Tabas County, South Khorasan Province, Iran. At the 2006 census, its population was 63, in 17 families.

References 

Populated places in Tabas County